John Andrew McCarty (February 9, 1867 – August 20, 1942) was an American Major League Baseball pitcher. He played for the Kansas City Cowboys of the American Association during the 1889 season. He also played minor league ball between 1887 and 1891.

Sources

1867 births
1942 deaths
19th-century baseball players
Major League Baseball pitchers
Kansas City Cowboys players
Emporia Reds players
Kansas City Blues (baseball) players
St. Joseph Clay Eaters players
San Francisco Haverlys players
Detroit Wolverines (minor league) players
Kansas City Cowboys (minor league) players
Baseball players from Missouri
Sportspeople from Independence, Missouri